This is a list of the main career statistics of Argentinian professional tennis player Diego Schwartzman. All statistics are according to the ATP Tour and ITF.

Performance timelines

Singles
Current through the 2023 BNP Paribas Open.

Doubles

Significant finals

Masters tournaments

Singles: 1 (1 runner-up)

Doubles: 2 (2 runner-ups)

ATP career finals

Singles: 14 (4 titles, 10 runner-ups)

Doubles: 5 (5 runner-ups)

ATP Challenger and ITF Futures finals

Singles: 37 (16–21)

Doubles: 22 (16–6)

Record against other players

Record against top-10 players
Schwartzman's match record against players who have been ranked in the Top 10, with those who are active in boldface.
Only ATP Tour (incl. Grand Slams) main draw, Davis Cup and Laver Cup matches are considered.

{|class="wikitable nowrap" style=text-align:center;font-size:96%
!Player
!width=30|
!width=30|
!width=30|Won
!width=30|Lost
!Win%
!Last Match
!width=40|Hard
!width=40|Clay
!width=40|Grass
|-
|-bgcolor=efefef class="sortbottom"
|align=left colspan=10|Number 1 ranked players
|-

||1–0||–||– 
|-

||0–6||1–5||– 
|-

||-||0–1||– 
|-

||0–2||0–2||– 
|-

||0–5||–||0–1 
|-

||0–4||0–3||–

|-bgcolor=efefef class="sortbottom"
|align=left colspan=10|Number 2 ranked players
|-

||3–1||2–2||–

||1–3||1–0||–

|-bgcolor=efefef class="sortbottom"
|align=left colspan=10|Number 3 ranked players
|-

||2–0||–||–

||1–1||0–1||1–0

||0–1||2–1||0–1

||1–3||2–3||–

||2–3||0-1||–

||0–1||–||–

||0–1||–||–

||0–2||–||–

|-bgcolor=efefef class="sortbottom"
|align=left colspan=10|Number 4 ranked players
|-

||1–1||1–2||–

||0–1||–||–

|-bgcolor=efefef class="sortbottom"
|align=left colspan=10|Number 5 ranked players
|-

||1–1||1–1||–

||0–3||1–0||–

||0–1||–||–

||–||0–1||–

|-bgcolor=efefef class="sort bottom"
|align=left colspan=10|Number 6 ranked players
|-

||2–0||–||–

||1–0||1–1||–

||2–1||1–1||–

||–||1–0||0–1

|-bgcolor=efefef class="sortbottom"
|align=left colspan=10|Number 7 ranked players
|-

||2–0||2–0||–

||1–5||–||–

||1–2||0–2||–

|-bgcolor=efefef class="sort bottom"
|align=left colspan=10|Number 8 ranked players
|-

||–||1–0||–

||1–0||–||–

||2–0||0-1||–

||2–2||1-0||–

||1–1||–||–

||1-3||–||–

||0–2||–||–

||0–1||0–1||–

|-bgcolor=efefef class="sortbottom"
|align=left colspan=10|Number 9 ranked players
|-

||2–0||0–1||–

||0–2||1–0||–

||0–2||1–0||-

||0–1||–||–

|-bgcolor=efefef class="sortbottom"
|align=left colspan=10|Number 10 ranked players
|-

||1–0||–||–

||1–0||–||–

||–||1–0||–

||1–1||0–3||–

|-bgcolor=efefef class="sortbottom"

Record against No. 11–20 players 

Active players are in boldface. 

 Albert Ramos Viñolas 5–2
 Bernard Tomic 3–0
 Marco Cecchinato 3–1
 Benoît Paire 3–1
 Pablo Cuevas 3–3
 Sam Querrey3–3
 Alexandr Dolgopolov 2–1
 Feliciano López 2–1
 Borna Ćorić 2–2
 Kyle Edmund 2–2
 Cristian Garín 2–2
 Guido Pella 2–2
 Frances Tiafoe 2–2
 Nikoloz Basilashvili 1–0
 Jerzy Janowicz 1–0
 Viktor Troicki 1–0
 Aslan Karatsev 1–2
 Philipp Kohlschreiber 1–1
 Reilly Opelka 1–2
 Marcel Granollers 0–1
 Nick Kyrgios 0–1
 Florian Mayer 0–1
 Andreas Seppi 0–1

*

Wins over top 10 players
Schwartzman has a  record against players who were, at the time the match was played, ranked in the top 10.

Career Grand Slam tournament seedings

*

National and international participation

Team competitions finals: 3 (1 title, 2 runner-up)

References

Schwartzman., Diego